Agostino "Angus" Giuseppe A Barbieri (1939 – 7 September 1990) was a Scottish man who fasted for 382 days, from June 1965 to July 1966. He lived on tea, coffee, sparkling water, and vitamins while living at home in Tayport, Scotland, and frequently visiting Maryfield Hospital for medical evaluation. He lost  and set a record for the length of a fast.

The fast
In 1965, Barbieri, then a 27-year-old from Tayport, Scotland, checked into the Maryfield Hospital in Dundee. Initially only a short fast was planned, due to the doctors believing that short fasts were preferable to longer ones. Barbieri did not believe them, insisting on continuing because "he adapted so well and was eager to reach his 'ideal' weight". For 382 days (1 year, 17 days) ending on 11 July 1966, he consumed only vitamins, electrolytes, an unspecified amount of yeast (a source of all essential amino acids) and zero-calorie beverages such as tea, coffee, and sparkling water, although he occasionally consumed small amounts of milk and/or sugar with the beverages, especially during the final weeks of the fast. He quit working at his father's fish and chip shop, which closed down during the fast.

Later life
After his weight loss, he moved to Warwick and had two sons. 

Barbieri died in September 1990.

Record
In the 1971 edition of The Guinness Book of Records, Barbieri's 382-day fast was recognized as the longest recorded. In 1973, Dennis Galer Goodwin went on a hunger strike for 385 days, but he was force-fed during this period. , Barbieri retains the record for the longest fast without solid food, according to Guinness officials. Guinness no longer officially endorses records relating to fasting for fear of encouraging unsafe behavior.

See also 

 Management of obesity
 Electrolyte imbalance

References 

Fasting
20th-century Scottish people
1939 births
1990 deaths
Weight loss
Guinness World Records
Obesity